The Chittorgarh (literally Chittor Fort), also known as Chittod Fort, is one of the largest forts in India. It is a UNESCO World Heritage Site. The fort was the capital of Mewar and is located in the present-day city of Chittorgarh. The fort covers 65 historic structures, which include four palaces, 19 large temples, 20 large water bodies, 4 memorials and a few victory towers.

In 2013, at the 37th session of the World Heritage Committee held in Phnom Penh, Cambodia, Chittorgarh Fort, along with five other forts of Rajasthan, was declared a UNESCO World Heritage Site, as a group called the Hill Forts of Rajasthan.

Geography

Chittorgarh, located in the southern part of the state of Rajasthan,  from Ajmer, midway between Delhi and Mumbai on the National Highway 8 (India) in the road network of Golden Quadrilateral. Chittorgarh is situated where National Highways No. 76 & 79 intersect.

It is situated on the left bank of the Berach river (a tributary of the Banas River) and is linked to the new town of Chittorgarh (known as the 'Lower Town') developed in the plains after 1568 AD when the fort was deserted in light of introduction of artillery in the 16th century, and therefore the capital was shifted to the more secure Udaipur, located on the eastern flank of the Aravalli hill range. Mughal Emperor Akbar attacked and sacked this fort which was but one of the 84 forts of Mewar, but the capital was shifted to Aravalli hills where heavy artillery & cavalry were not effective. A winding hill road of more than  length from the new town leads to the west end main gate, called Ram Pol, of the fort. Within the fort, a circular road provides access to all the gates and monuments located within the fort walls.

The fort that once boasted of 84 water bodies has only 22 of them now. These water bodies are fed by natural catchment and rainfall, and have a combined storage of 4 billion litres that could meet the water needs of an army of 50,000. The supply could last for four years. These water bodies are in the form of ponds, wells and step wells.

History

Chittorgarh (garh means fort) was originally called Chitrakut. It is said to have been built by a local Mori Rajput ruler Chitrangada Mori. According to one legend, the name of the fort is derived from its builder. Another folk legend attributes the construction of fort to the legendary hero Bhima: it states that Bhima struck the ground here, which resulted in water springing up to form a large reservoir. The water body allegedly formed by Bhima is an artificial tank called Bhimlat Kund. Several small Buddhist stupas dated to 9th century based on the script were found at the edge of Jaimal Patta lake.

The Guhila ruler Bappa Rawal is said to have captured the fort in either 728 CE or 734 CE. One account states that he received the fort in dowry. According to other versions of the legend, Bappa Rawal captured the fort either from the mlechchhas or the Moris. Historian R. C. Majumdar theorizes that the Moris (Mauryas) were ruling at Chittor when the Arabs (mlechchhas) invaded north-western India around 725 CE. The Arabs defeated the Moris, and in turn, were defeated by a confederacy that included Bappa Rawal. R. V. Somani theorized that Bappa Rawal was a part of the army of Nagabhata I. Some historians doubt the historicity of this legend, arguing that the Guhilas did not control Chittor before the reign of the later ruler Allata. The earliest Guhila inscription discovered at Chittor is from the reign of Tejasimha (mid-13th century); it mentions "Chitrakuta-maha-durga" (the great fort of Chittor).

Siege of 1303

In 1303, the Delhi Sultanate ruler Alauddin Khalji led an army to conquer Chittorgarh, which was ruled by the Guhila king Ratnasimha. Alauddin captured Chittor after an eight-month-long siege. According to his courtier Amir Khusrow, he ordered a massacre of 30,000 local Hindus after this conquest. Some later legends state that Alauddin invaded Chittor to capture Ratnasimha's beautiful queen Padmini, but most modern historians have rejected the authenticity of these legends. The legends also state that Padmini and other women committed suicide by jauhar (mass self-immolation). Historian Kishori Saran Lal believes that a jauhar did happen at Chittorgarh following Alauddin's conquest, although he dismisses the legend of Padmini as unhistorical. On the other hand, historian Banarsi Prasad Saksena considers this jauhar narrative as a fabrication by the later writers, because Khusrow does not mention any jauhar at Chittorgarh, although he has referred to the jauhar during the earlier conquest of Ranthambore.

Alauddin assigned Chittorgarh to his young son Khizr Khan (or Khidr Khan), and the Chittorgarh fort was renamed "Khizrabad" after the prince. As Khizr Khan was only a child, the actual administration was handed over to a slave named Malik Shahin.

Rana Hammir and successors
Khizr Khan's rule at the fort lasted till 1311 AD and due to the pressure of Rajputs he was forced to entrust power to the Sonigra chief Maldeva who held the fort for 7 years. Hammir Singh, usurped control of the fort from Maldeva and Chittor once again regained its past glory. Hammir, before his death in 1378 AD, had converted Mewar into a fairly large and prosperous kingdom. The dynasty (and clan) fathered by him came to be known by the name Sisodia after the village where he was born. His son Ketra Singh succeeded him and ruled with honour and power. Ketra Singh's son Lakha who ascended the throne in 1382 AD also won several wars. His famous grandson Rana Kumbha came to the throne in 1433 AD and by that time the Muslim rulers of Malwa and Gujarat had acquired considerable clout and were keen to usurp the powerful Mewar state.

Rana Kumbha and clan

There was resurgence during the reign of Rana Kumbha in the 15th century. Rana Kumbha, also known as Maharana Kumbhakarna, son of Rana Mokal, ruled Mewar between 1433 AD and 1468 AD. He is credited with building up the Mewar kingdom assiduously as a force to reckon with. He built 32 forts (84 fortresses formed the defense of Mewar) including one in his own name, called Kumbalgarh. His brother Rana Raimal assumed the reins of power in 1473. After his death in May 1509, Sangram Singh (also known as Rana Sanga), his youngest son, became the ruler of Mewar, which brought in a new phase in the history of Mewar.

Chittorgarh Under Rana Sanga
Rana Sanga ascended the throne in 1509 after a long struggle with his brothers. He was an ambitious king under whom Mewar reached its zenith in power and prosperity. Rajput strength under Rana Sanga reached its zenith and threatens to revive their powers again in Northern India. He established a strong kingdom from Satluj in Punjab in North till Narmada River in South in Malwa. After conquering Malwa and the Thar desert to the west and until Bayana in the east. In his military career he defeated Ibrahim Lodhi at the Battle of Khatoli and manage to free most of Rajasthan along with that he mark his control over parts of Uttar Pradesh including Chandwar, he gave the part of U.P to his allies Rao Manik Chand Chauhan who later supported him in Battle of khanwa. After that Rana Sanga fought another battle with Ibrahim Lodhi known as Battle of Dholpur where again Rajput confederacy were victorious. This time following his victory Sanga conquered much of the Malwa along with Chanderi and bestowed it to one of his vassal Medini Rai. Rai ruled over Malwa with Chanderi as his capital. Sanga also invaded Gujarat with 50,000 Rajput confederacy joined by his three allies. He plundered Gujarat sultanate and chased the Muslim Army as far as capital Ahmedabad. He successfully annexed Northern Gujarat and appoint one of his vassals to rule there. Following the series of victories over Sultans he successfully establish his sovereignty over Rajasthan, Malwa and large parts of Gujarat. After these victories he united several Rajput states from Northern India to expel Babur from India and re-establish Hindu power in Delhi.
 He advanced with a grand army of 100,000 Rajputs supported by a few Afghans to expel Babur and to expand his territory by annexing Delhi and Agra. The battle was fought for supremacy of Northern India between Rajputs and Mughals.
However Rajput Confederation suffered a disastrous defeat at Khanwa due to Babur's superior generalship and modern tactics. The battle was more historic than First Battle of Panipat as it firmly establish Mughal rule in India while crushing re-emerging Rajput powers. The battle was also earliest to use cannons, matchlocks, swivel guns and mortars to great use.

Rana Sanga was taken away from the battlefield in an unconscious state by his vassals Prithviraj Singh I of Jaipur and Maldeo Rathore of Marwar. After regaining consciousness he took an oath to never return to Chittorgarh until he defeated Babur and conquer Delhi. He also stop wearing turban and used to wrap a cloth over his head. While he was preparing to wage another war against Babur he was poisoned by his own nobles who did not want another battle with Babur. He died in Kalpi in January 1528.

After his defeat his vassal Medini Rai was defeated by Babur at Battle of Chanderi and Babur captured the capital of Rai kingdom Chanderi. Medini was offered Shamsabad instead of Chanderi as it was historically important in conquering Malwa but Rao refused the offer and chose to die fighting. The Rajput women and children committed self-immolation to save their honour from Muslim army. After the victory, Babur captured Chanderi along with Malwa which was ruled by Rai.

Post Rana Sanga

Siege of 1535
Bahadur Shah who came to the throne in 1526 AD as the Sultan of Gujarat besieged the Chittorgarh fort in 1535. The fort was sacked and, once again the medieval dictates of chivalry determined the outcome. Following the escape of the Rana, his brother Udai Singh and the faithful maid Panna Dhai to Bundi, it is said 13,000 Rajput women committed jauhar (self-immolation on the funeral pyre) and 3,200 Rajput warriors rushed out of the fort to fight and died in the ensuing battle.

Siege of 1567

The final Siege of Chittorgarh came 33 years later, in 1567, when the Mughal Emperor Akbar attacked the fort. Akbar wanted to conquer Mewar, which was being ruled by Rana Uday Singh II to gain easy access to the Gujarati ports and establish a trade route.

Shakti Singh, son of the Rana who had quarreled with his father, had run away and approached Akbar when the later had camped at Dholpur preparing to attack Malwa. During one of these meetings, in August 1567, Shakti Singh deduced from a remark made in jest by emperor Akbar that he intended to wage war against Chittorgarh. Akbar had told Shakti Singh in jest that since his father had not submitted himself before him like other princes and chieftains of the region he would attack him. Startled by this revelation, Shakti Singh quietly rushed back to Chittorgarh and informed his father of the impending invasion by Akbar. Akbar was furious with the departure of Shakti Singh and decided to attack Mewar to humble the arrogance of the Ranas.

In September 1567, the emperor left for Chittorgarh, and on 20 October 1567, camped in the vast plains outside the fort. In the meantime, Rana Udai Singh, on the advice of his council of advisors, decided to go away from Chittor to the hills of Gogunda with his family. Jaimal and Patta were left behind to defend the fort along with 8,000 Rajput soldiers under their command. Akbar laid siege to the fortress, which lasted for 4 months.

On 22 February 1568, Jaimal was killed by a musket shot fired by Akbar himself. Jauhar was committed in the houses of Patta, Aissar Das, and Sahib Khan. The next day the gates of the fort were opened and Rajput soldiers rushed out to fight the enemies. In the ensuing battle, the army of Chittorgarh were killed alongside 20,000–25,000 civilians and Chittorgarh was conquered.

Mughal–Rajput peace treaty of 1616
In 1616, after a treaty between Jahangir and Amar Singh, Chittorgarh was given back to Amar Singh by Jahangir.

The fort was refurbished in 1905 during British Raj.

Precincts

The bridge spans the Gambhiri River and is supported by ten arches (one has a curved shape while the balance have pointed arches). Apart from the two tall towers, which dominate the majestic fortifications, the sprawling fort has a plethora of palaces and temples (many of them in ruins) within its precincts.

The 305 hectare component site, with a buffer zone of 427 hectares, encompasses the fortified stronghold of Chittorgarh, a spacious fort located on an isolated rocky plateau of approximately 2 km length and 155 m width.

The ascent to the fort passes through seven gateways built by the Mewar ruler Rana Kumbha (1433–1468) of the Sisodia clan. These gates are called, from the base to the hilltop, the Paidal Pol, Bhairon Pol, Hanuman Pol, Ganesh Pol, Jorla Pol, Laxman Pol, and Ram Pol, the final and main gate.

The fort complex comprises 65 historic built structures, among them 4 palace complexes, 19 main temples, 4 memorials, and 20 functional water bodies. These can be divided into two major construction phases. The first hill fort with one main entrance was established in the 5th century and successively fortified until the 12th century. Its remains are mostly visible on the western edges of the plateau. The second, more significant defence structure was constructed in the 15th century during the reign of the Sisodia Rajputs, when the royal entrance was relocated and fortified with seven gates, and the medieval fortification wall was built on an earlier wall construction from the 13th century.

Besides the palace complex, located on the highest and most secure terrain in the west of the fort, many of the other significant structures, such as the Kumbha Shyam Temple, the Mira Bai Temple, the Adi Varah Temple, the Shringar Chauri Temple, and the Vijay Stambh memorial were constructed in this second phase. Compared to the later additions of Sisodian rulers during the 19th and 20th centuries, the predominant construction phase illustrates a comparatively pure Rajput style combined with minimal eclecticism, such as the vaulted substructures which were borrowed from Sultanate architecture. The 4.5 km walls with integrated circular enforcements are constructed from dressed stone masonry in lime mortar and rise 500 m above the plain. With the help of the seven massive stone gates, partly flanked by hexagonal or octagonal towers, the access to the fort is restricted to a narrow pathway which climbs up the steep hill through successive, ever narrower defence passages. The seventh and final gate leads directly into the palace area, which integrates a variety of residential and official structures. Rana Kumbha Mahal, the palace of Rana Kumbha, is a large Rajput domestic structure and now incorporates the Kanwar Pade Ka Mahal (the palace of the heir) and the later palace of the poet Mira Bai (1498–1546). The palace area was further expanded in later centuries, when additional structures, such as the Ratan Singh Palace (1528–1531) or the Fateh Prakash, also named Badal Mahal (1885–1930), were added.

Although the majority of temple structures represent the Hindu faith, most prominently the Kalikamata Temple (8th century), the Kshemankari Temple (825–850) the Kumbha Shyam Temple (1448) or the Adbuthnath Temple (15th–16th century), the hill fort also contains Jain temples, such as Sattaees Devari, Shringar Chauri (1448) and Sat Bis Devri (mid-15th century) Also the two tower memorials, Kirti Stambh (12th century) and Vijay Stambha (1433–1468), are Jain monuments. They stand out with their respective heights of 24 m and 37 m, which ensure their visibility from most locations of the fort complex. Finally, the fort compound is home to a contemporary municipal ward of approximately 3,000 inhabitants, which is located near Ratan Singh Tank at the northern end of the property.

Gates

The fort has total seven gates (in local language, gate is called Pol) in the west, namely the Padan Pol, Bhairon Pol, Hanuman Pol, Ganesh Pol, Jodla Pol, Laxman Pol, and the main gate named the Ram Pol (Lord Rama's Gate). All the gateways to the fort have been built as massive stone structures with secure fortifications for military defense. The doors of the gates with pointed arches are reinforced to fend off elephants and cannon shots. The top of the gates has notched parapets for archers to shoot at the enemy army. A circular road within the fort links all the gates and provides access to the numerous monuments (ruined palaces and 130 temples) in the fort.

On the right of Suraj Pol is the Darikhana or Sabha (council chamber) behind which lie a Ganesha temple and the zenana (living quarters for women). A massive water reservoir is located towards the left of Suraj Pol. There is also a peculiar gate, called the Jorla Pol (Joined Gate), which consists of two gates joined. The upper arch of Jorla Pol is connected to the base of Lakshman Pol. It is said that this feature has not been noticed anywhere else in India. The Lokota Bari is the gate at the fort's northern tip, while a small opening that was used to hurl criminals into the abyss is seen at the southern end.

Vijaya Stambha

The Vijaya Stambha (Tower of Victory) or Jaya Stambha, called the symbol of Chittorgarh and a particularly bold expression of triumph, was erected by Rana Kumbha between 1458 and 1468 to commemorate his victory over Mahmud Shah I Khalji, the Sultan of Malwa, in 1440 AD. Built over a period of ten years, it rises  over a  base in nine stories accessed through a narrow circular staircase of 157 steps (the interior is also carved) up to the 8th floor, from where there is good view of the plains and the new town of Chittorgarh. The dome, which was a later addition, was damaged by lightning and repaired during the 19th century. The Stambha is now illuminated during the evenings and gives a beautiful view of Chittorgarh from the top.

Kirti Stambha

Built by the Bagherwal Jain merchant Jijaji Rathod, it is dedicated to Adinath, the first Jain tirthankar (revered Jain teacher). In the lowest floor of the tower, figures of the various tirthankars of the Jain pantheon are seen in special niches formed to house them. These are digambara monuments. A narrow stairway with 54 steps leads through the six storeys to the top. The top pavilion that was added in the 15th century has 12 columns.

Rana Kumbha Palace
Rana Kumbha's palace (in ruins) is located at the entrance gate near the Vijaya Stamba. The palace included elephant and horse stables and a temple to Lord Shiva. Maharana Udai Singh, the founder of Udaipur, was born here; the popular folk lore linked to his birth is that his maid Panna Dai. Panna Dhai saved him by substituting her son in his place as a decoy, which resulted in her son getting killed by Banbir. The prince was spirited away in a fruit basket. The palace is built with plastered stone. The remarkable feature of the palace is its splendid series of canopied balconies. Entry to the palace is through Suraj Pol that leads into a courtyard. Rani Meera, the famous poet-saint, also lived in this palace. This is also the palace where Rani Padmini is said to have consigned herself to the funeral pyre in one of the underground cellars, as an act of jauhar along with many other women. The Nau Lakha Bandar (literal meaning: nine lakh treasury) building, the royal treasury of Chittorgarh was also located close by. Now, across from the palace is a museum and archeological office. The Singa Chowri temple is also nearby.

Fateh Prakash Palace
Located near Rana Khumba palace, built by Rana Fateh Singh, the precincts have modern houses and a small museum. A school for local children (about 5,000 villagers live within the fort) is also nearby.

Gaumukh Reservoir

A spring feeds the tank from a carved cow's mouth in the cliff. This pool was the main source of water at the fort during the numerous sieges.

Padmini's Palace
Padmini's Palace or Rani Padmini's Palace is a white building and a three storied structure (a 19th-century reconstruction of the original). It is located in the southern part of the fort. Chhatris (pavilions) crown the palace roofs and a water moat surround the palace. This style of the palace became the forerunner of other palaces built in the state with the concept of Jal Mahal (palace surrounded by water). Maharana Ratan Singh was killed and Rani Padmini committed Jauhar. Rani Padmini's beauty has been compared to that of Cleopatra and her life story is an eternal legend in the history of Chittorgarh. This Palace find its reference in some of the historical texts of Mewar. Amar Kavyam mentions the confinement of Mahmud Khilji- II, Sultan of Malwa here by Rana Sanga. Maharana Udai Singh married his daughter JasmaDe to Rai Singh of Bikaner. A song was composed about the charity done by Rai Singh, in which it is mentions that he donated an elephant for each step of the stairs of Padmini's Palace. It was repaired by Maharana  Sajjan Singh.

Other sights

Close to Vijay Sthamba is the Meera Temple, or the Meerabai Temple. Rana Khumba built it in an ornate Indo-Aryan architectural style. It is associated with the mystic saint-poet Mirabai who was an ardent devotee of Lord Krishna and dedicated her entire life to His worship. She composed and sang lyrical bhajans called Meera Bhajans. The popular legend associated with her is that with blessings of Krishna, she survived after consuming poison sent to her by her evil brother-in-law. The larger temple in the same compound is the Kumbha Shyam Temple (Varaha Temple). The pinnacle of the temple is in pyramid shape. A picture of Meerabai praying before Krishna has now been installed in the temple.

Across from Padmini's Palace is the Kalika Mata Temple. Originally, a Sun Temple dated to the 8th century dedicated to Surya (the Sun God) was destroyed in the 14th century. It was rebuilt as a Kali temple.

Another temple on the west side of the fort is the old Goddess Tulja Bhavani Temple built by Banvir and dedicated to Goddess Tulja Bhavani. The Tope Khana (cannon foundry) is located next to this temple in a courtyard, where a few old cannons are still seen.

Culture
The fort and the city of Chittorgarh host the biggest Rajput festival called the "Jauhar Mela". It takes place annually on the anniversary of one of the jauhars, but no specific name has been given to it. It is generally believed that it commemorates Padmavati's jauhar, which is most famous. This festival is held primarily to commemorate the bravery of Rajput ancestors and all three jauhars which happened at Chittorgarh Fort. A huge number of Rajputs, which include the descendants of most of the princely families, hold a procession to celebrate the Jauhar. It has also become a forum to air one's views on the current political situation in the country.

Six forts of Rajasthan, namely, Amber Fort, Chittorgarh Fort, Gagron Fort, Jaisalmer Fort, Kumbhalgarh and Ranthambore Fort were included in the UNESCO World Heritage Site list during the 37th meeting of the World Heritage Committee in Phnom Penh in June 2013. They were recognized as a serial cultural property and examples of Rajput military hill architecture.

The ruined city of the Cold Lairs from The Jungle Book by Rudyard Kipling, where the protagonist Mowgli is taken to after being kidnapped by the Bandar-log, is noted by the Kipling Society to have possibly been based on Chittorgarh Fort, which Kipling personally visited in 1887, and would have been relatively close to the Aravalli Range also located in Rajasthan, the original setting of the Jungle Books before Kipling changed it to the hills of Seoni in Madhya Pradesh.

Gallery

References

Bibliography

External links 

 
 

 
Forts in Rajasthan
1567 in India
1535 in India
7th-century establishments in India
Tourist attractions in Chittorgarh district
World Heritage Sites in India